Jalan Padang Besar–Bukit Kuan Choh, Federal Route 250 (formerly Perlis State Route 127), is a federal road in Perlis, Malaysia. The roads is used by the Border Regiment (Rejimen Pengurusan Sempadan) of the Malaysian Army as a border road of the Malaysia-Thailand border.

List of junctions

Malaysian Federal Roads
Roads in Perlis